Dreuil-lès-Amiens (literally Dreuil near Amiens) is a commune in the Somme department in Hauts-de-France in northern France.

Geography
The commune, a suburb of Amiens, is situated on the banks of the river Somme. Dreuil-lès-Amiens station has rail connections to Amiens and Abbeville.

Population

See also
Communes of the Somme department

References

Communes of Somme (department)